This is a list of notable cheeses in English cuisine. Some sources claim that at least 927 varieties of cheese are produced in England. Fourteen English cheeses are classified as protected designation of origin.

In English cuisine, foods such as cheese have ancient origins. The 14th-century English cookery book The Forme of Cury contains recipes for these, and dates from the royal court of Richard II.

English cheeses

See also
 List of cheeses
 List of British cheeses
 List of Cornish cheeses
 List of English dishes

Notes

References

Further reading

External links

English cheeses
English
Cheeses